Laurent Baumel (born 13 August 1965) is a French politician.  He was the deputy for Indre-et-Loire's 4th constituency in the French National Assembly from 2012 to 2017.

References 

1965 births
Living people
Socialist Party (France) politicians
People from Charleville-Mézières
Lycée Louis-le-Grand alumni
École Centrale de Lyon alumni
Sciences Po alumni
Deputies of the 14th National Assembly of the French Fifth Republic
Politicians from Grand Est